Fakhr-un-Nissa (died 1501) was a Mughal princess as the eldest child of the first Mughal Emperor Babur and his Empress consort Aisha Sultan Begum.

Fakhr-un-Nissa was born in 1501 in Samarkand to the nineteen-year-old Babur and his first wife, Aisha Sultan Begum. Upon her birth, she was given the name of Fakhr-un-Nissa ("Glory of Women"). The princess died a month or forty days after her birth, and her death grieved Babur the most as he dearly loved his daughter.

Ancestry

References

Mughal princesses
Indian female royalty
Timurid dynasty
Babur
Women of the Mughal Empire
1501 births
1501 deaths
16th-century Indian women
16th-century Indian people
Daughters of emperors
Royalty and nobility who died as children